Thynnus zonatus is a species of wasp found in Australia.

Description

Range

Habitat

Ecology

Etymology

Taxonomy

References

Insects of Australia
Thynnidae